The King Stays King: Sold Out At Madison Square Garden is the first live album and first concert film by American singer Romeo Santos as a solo artist. It is based on 3 concerts that sold out 3 nights in a row at Madison Square Garden on February 11, 23, and 24, of 2012. This was part of The King Stays King tour. The film version was made for DVD in which it was released on the same day as the audio CD version. It is also available on HBO Max. It is his first concert film as a solo artist as well.

Track listing

DVD & Digital Film

Included Acts. These acts are actually videos in between songs about Romeo Santos talking about various topics.

Act 1: Show Open 

 You - 4:01 
 La Diabla - 3:45 
 Malevo - 4:06 
 Por Un Segundo - 2:47 

Act 2: Rituals & Younger Days 

 Que Se Mueran - 3:56	
 Su Veneno - 3:53 
 Mi Corazoncito (featuring P. Diddy) - 4:12 

Act 3: New York & 3 Homes 

 Debate de 4 (featuring Anthony Santos & Luis Vargas) - 4:47 
 Magia Negra - 3:49 
 Soberbio - 4:16 
 Llévame Contigo - 3:49 
 La Bella Y La Bestia - 3:48 

Act 4: The Love Of His Fans 

 Medley: La Película/Enséñame A Olvidar/Todavía Me Amas - 8:25 

Act 5: Being An Artist 

 Vale La Pena El Placer - 3:04 
 Medley: Rival/All Aboard - 3:12 
 Noche de Sexo (featuring Wisin & Yandel) - 3:43 
 Mi Santa featuring Tomatito - 3:58 

Act 6: Closing 

 Promise (featuring Usher) - 9:16 

Credits

Bonus Footage
 Backstage
 Halloween

Charts

Weekly charts

Year-end charts

Certifications

See also
List of number-one Billboard Latin Albums from the 2010s
List of number-one Billboard Tropical Albums from the 2010s

References

2012 live albums
Romeo Santos live albums
Sony Music Latin live albums
Albums recorded at Madison Square Garden
Spanish-language live albums